Lawang is a district and town in Malang Regency, East Java and is geographically located in the mountains and surrounded by Mount Arjuno and Mount Semeru. It covers an area of 68.23 km2 and had a population of 103,402 at the 2010 Census and 110,981 at the 2020 Census. It orders with Singosari District to the south (in Malang Regency) and Purwodadi district of Pasuruan Regency to the north.  Lawang is known as a resort town since the Dutch colonial era.

Tourist attractions in Lawang include Wonosari Tea Garden PTP XXIII, Polaman Baths, Swimming Pools, Krabayakan Tourism Village, and Mount Wedon. In addition, many historical buildings in Lawang are of Dutch origin.

Together with Singosari and Kepanjen, Lawang is known as the main buffer satellite city of Malang, and is included in the area of Malang Raya (Greater Malang).

Hurustiati Subandrio, Sukarno-era politician and wife of Foreign Minister Subandrio, was born in Lawang.

References

Populated places in East Java
Districts of East Java